Trachylepis hildebrandtii, also known commonly as Hildebrandt's mabuya and Hildebrandt’s skink, is a species of lizard in the family Scincidae. The species is indigenous to the Horn of Africa.

Etymology
T. hidebrandtii is named after Johann Maria Hildebrandt, who was a German botanist and explorer.<ref>Beolens, Bo; Watkins, Michael; Grayson, Michael (2011). The Eponym Dictionary of Reptiles. Baltimore: Johns Hopkins University Press. xiii + 296 pp. . (Mabuya hildebrandtii, p. 123).</ref>

Geographic rangeT. hildebrandtii is found in eastern Ethiopia and Somalia.

Reproduction
The mode of reproduction of T. hildebrandtii is unknown.

References

Further reading
Boulenger GA (1892). "On some Reptiles collected by Sig. L. Bricchetti Robecchi [sic] in Somaliland". Annali del Museo Civico di Storia Naturale di Genova, Serie Seconda 12: 5–15 + Plate I. (Mabuia hildebrandtii, new combination, p. 12).
Lanza B (1990). "Amphibians and reptiles of the Somali Democratic Republic: check list and biogeography". Biogeographia 14: 407–465.
Peters W (1874). "Über einige neue Reptilien (Lacerta, Eremias, Diploglossus, Euprepes, Lygosoma, Sepsina, Ablepharus, Simotes, Onychocephalus)". Monatsberichte der Königlich preussischen Akademie der Wissenschaften zu Berlin 1874: 368–377. (Euprepes hidebrandtii'', new species, pp. 372–373 + Figures 4, 4a, 4b on p. 377). (in German).

Trachylepis
Skinks of Africa
Reptiles of Ethiopia
Reptiles of Somalia
Reptiles described in 1874
Taxa named by Wilhelm Peters